Lilián Jesús Villanueva Chan is a Mexican model who became the only woman from her country to be crowned International Queen of Flowers and competed in Nuestra Belleza México 2000, obtaining the title of Nuestra Belleza Internacional México.

Nuestra Belleza México 2000
Born in Quintana Roo and raised in Chetumal, she represented her state and competed against fourthy-three other contestants for the national beauty title of Mexico, Nuestra Belleza México 2000, held in Apizaco, Tlaxcala on September 2, 2000.

She was chosen to represent Mexico in the 2001 Miss International pageant, but didn't compete because Nuestra Belleza México temporarily lost the franchise to send representatives to Miss International that year.

Reina Internacional de las Flores
Instead, she competed in the International Queen of Flowers pageant held in Colombia where she became the favorite and was eventually chosen as the winner of the title on August 11, 2001.

After Nuestra Belleza
In September 2009, she received the Corona al Merito award, for her winning International Queen of Flowers and overall performance as a beauty queen.

See also
Nuestra Belleza México 2000

References

External links
 History: NBM and Evolution

 

Living people
People from Chetumal, Quintana Roo
Nuestra Belleza México winners
Models from Quintana Roo
Year of birth missing (living people)